Whitlam Square, a road junction located in Sydney, New South Wales, Australia, constitutes an important intersection of major streets in the south-eastern portion of the city's central business district.  The square is named in honour of Gough Whitlam, the Prime Minister of Australia from 1972-75.

Streets intersecting at Whitlam Square include Oxford Street, Liverpool Street, College Street and Wentworth Avenue. The south-east corner of Hyde Park is located at the square, with the HMAS Sydney I - SMS Emden Memorial, consisting of a  gun from the German light cruiser , facing into the square.

Holdsworthy Gallery is identified at times as being at the Whitlam Square end of Liverpool Street.

The Sydney YMCA also identified as located at the square.

Popular culture 
Whitlam Square is also the title of a song released in 1990 by the Australian band Died Pretty.

See also

References 

Streets in Sydney
Sydney localities
Darlinghurst, New South Wales
College Street, Sydney
Liverpool Street, Sydney